Akutan Airport  is a state-owned public-use airport serving Akutan, a city on Akutan Island in the Aleutians East Borough of the U.S. state of Alaska. Scheduled air service is subsidized by the Essential Air Service program.

The airport was opened in 2012. Akutan was previously served by amphibious airplane service to Akutan Seaplane Base, located on Akutan Island. However, in 2012 operator PenAir announced that they would retire their Grumman Goose aircraft and as a result the traditional airport on Akun Island was built to serve Akutan. The airport on Akun was originally connected to Akutan by a hovercraft, but the connection is now provided via helicopter operated by Maritime Helicopters.

Facilities 
Akutan Airport covers an area of 369 acres (149 ha) at an elevation of 133 feet (41 m) above mean sea level. It has one runway designated 9/27 with an asphalt surface measuring 4,500 by 75 feet (1,372 x 23 m).

Airlines and destinations 
The following airline offers scheduled passenger service at this airport:

Statistics

See also 
 Akutan Seaplane Base (IATA: was KQA, FAA LID: KQA) located at

References

Other sources 

 Essential Air Service documents (Docket DOT-OST-2000-7068) from the U.S. Department of Transportation:
 Order 2012-11-15 (November 16, 2012): selecting Grant Aviation, Inc., to provide Essential Air Service at Akutan, Alaska, for two years, beginning as soon as the carrier inaugurates scheduled service (November 28, 2012) at annual subsidy rates of $724,025 for the first six months of service and $579,220 for the remainder of the contract (through September 30, 2014). Akutan receives 12 nonstop round trips per week to Dutch Harbor with 9-seat Piper PA-31 Navajo aircraft.
 Order 2014-6-3 (June 6, 2014): requesting proposals from air carriers interested in providing Essential Air Service (EAS) at Akutan, Alaska, for a new contract period beginning October 1, 2014.

External links 

 Akutan Airport at Aleutians East Borough website

Airports in Aleutians East Borough, Alaska
Essential Air Service